'Force Recon' is the second studio album by English thrash metal band Virus.

Track listing
"Testify to Me" - 05:15 	
"Viral Warfare" - 06:05 	
"Force Recon" - 06:00 	
"Release the Dead" - 03:51 	
"No Return" - 03:28 	
"B.S.S.D. (Burning - Shouting - Screaming - Dying)" - 02:54 	
"Hungry For Blood / Munster Mosh" - 08:42

Virus' groundbreaking 2nd album will be re-released in July 2018 by Combat Records in celebration of its 30th Anniversary.  Original band members Henry Heston-Vocals, Guitar,  Coke Finlay- Guitars, Damien Hess-Bass and Tez Kaylor-Drums.

1988 albums
Thrash metal albums by English artists